Cercle Sportif Don Bosco de Lubumbashi or simply CS Don Bosco is a football club from DR Congo based in Lubumbashi. They play their home games at the 18,000 capacity Stade TP Mazembe. The club serves as a feeder club to TP Mazembe and is owned by Moïse Katumbi Chapwe's son.

Honours
Coupe du Congo
 Winners (1): 2012
 Runner-up (1): 2016

Performance in CAF competitions
CAF Confederation Cup: 1 appearance
2014 - First round

Current squad
As of March 2014.

References

External links
Team profile  – The Biggest Football Archive of the World

 
Football clubs in the Democratic Republic of the Congo
Football clubs in Lubumbashi
Sports clubs in the Democratic Republic of the Congo
Association football clubs established in 1948
1948 establishments in the Belgian Congo